Wellington Hospital might refer to:
 Wellington Hospital, New Zealand, a hospital in Wellington, New Zealand
 Wellington Hospital, London, a hospital in London, United Kingdom